Brestovac is a village in the municipality of Bor, Serbia. According to the 2002 census, the village has a population of 2950 people.

See also
Populated places of Serbia

References

Populated places in Bor District
Bor, Serbia